The Miss Perú 1960 pageant was held on June 28, 1960. Sixteen candidates competed for the two national crowns. The chosen winners represented Peru at the Miss Universe 1960 and, for the first time, at Miss International 1960. The rest of the finalists would enter different pageants.

Placements

Special Awards

 Miss Photogenic - Distrito Capital - Irma Vargas Fuller
 Miss Congeniality - Tacna - Alina Amado 
 Miss Elegance - Ica - Maricruz Gómez

.

Delegates

Amazonas - Lilian Revilla
Áncash - Luz Freire
Ayacucho - Carmen Estela De La Torre Ramirez
Cuzco - Antonieta Martínez
Distrito Capital - Irma Vargas Fuller
Huancavelica - Jennifer Cano
Huánuco - Elena Barreda
Ica - Maricruz Gómez Díaz

La Libertad - Ana Parker
Lambayeque - Medallit Gallino
Loreto - Raquel Muro
Piura - Olga Lanfranco
San Martín - Silvia Arteaga
Tacna - Alina Amado del Pozo
Tumbes - Maricarmen Barone
USA Perú - Molly Watson

References 

Miss Peru
1960 in Peru
1960 beauty pageants